The 2023 Northwest Territories Scotties Tournament of Hearts, the women's territorial curling championship for the Northwest Territories, was held from January 11 to 15 at the Inuvik Curling Centre in Inuvik, Northwest Territories. The winning Kerry Galusha rink represented the Northwest Territories at the 2023 Scotties Tournament of Hearts in Kamloops, British Columbia, and finished fourth in Pool B with a 4–4 record.

Teams
The teams are as follows:

Round-robin standings
Final round-robin standings

Round-robin results
All draw times are listed in Mountain Time (UTC-07:00).

Draw 1
Wednesday, January 11, 7:30 pm

Draw 2
Thursday, January 12, 2:00 pm

Draw 3
Thursday, January 12, 8:00 pm

Draw 4
Friday, January 13, 2:00 pm

Draw 5
Friday, January 13, 8:00 pm

Draw 6
Saturday, January 14, 2:00 pm

Playoffs

1 vs. 2
Sunday, January 15, 10:00 am

Semifinal
Sunday, January 15, 3:00 pm

Final
Sunday, January 15, 8:00 pm

References

2023 in the Northwest Territories
Curling in the Northwest Territories
2023 Scotties Tournament of Hearts
January 2023 sports events in Canada
Inuvik